The Melianthaceae are a family of flowering plants.  The APG II system includes them within the rosid clade.  All members of Melianthaceae proper are trees or shrubs found in tropical and southern Africa.  Francoaceae (the Bridal wreaths) are sometimes included in the family, a family consisting of two monotypic genera found in Chile.

Classification
The family Greyiaceae is merged into Melianthaceae in the APG II system. The family Francoaceae is optionally included within Melianthaceae.

Melianthaceae sensu stricto
 Bersama - 8 species
 Melianthus - 6 species

Greyiaceae (included in Melianthaceae)
 Greyia - three species

Francoaceae (sometimes included, sometimes a separate family)
 Francoa - three species
 Tetilla hydrocotylefolia - a single species

References

Geraniales
Rosid families
Historically recognized angiosperm families